The 2021 W-League grand final was the final match of the 2020–21 W-League season to decide the champions of women's soccer in Australia for the season.

The match was played between Sydney FC and Melbourne Victory at Netstrata Jubilee Stadium on 11 April 2021. Melbourne Victory won their second championship with a goal from Kyra Cooney-Cross after 120 minutes.

This was the league's last match under its original "W-League" branding. Football Australia changed the league's name to A-League Women effective with the 2021–22 season.

Teams

Route to the final

Match details

References

Grand final
Soccer in Sydney
A-League Women Grand Finals